Chaotic Neutral may refer to:

 Chaotic neutral, a categorization of characters in Dungeons & Dragons
 Chaotic Neutral (album), an album by Matthew Good